Arthur McKenzie Dodson (18191874) was  a member of the Los Angeles Common Council, the governing body of that city, from 1859 to 1862.

Dodson was born in Philadelphia, Pennsylvania, in 1819.

California
In 1849 he took part in the California Gold Rush, but had no luck and so settled in Los Angeles in 1850, where he set up a butcher shop and one of the first grocery stores in the Pueblo de Los Angeles. He was also the first soapmaker in Los Angeles. He was in partnership with John Benner. Dodson also established a coal and wood yard at the corner of Spring and Sixth streets, and he "started there a little community which he called Georgetown as a compliment to the famous Round House George[,] whose bakery, . . . was located on that corner."

Dodson was married in Los Angeles to Reyes Dominguez, the daughter of Nazario Dominguez, part owner of Rancho San Pedro. The couple had twelve children, of which "only four grew to maturity": James H., Emma, John F. and Caroline.

Dodson died in Tucson, Arizona, in 1874 and was buried in Wilmington, Los Angeles.

References

Businesspeople from Los Angeles
Los Angeles Common Council (1850–1889) members
19th-century American politicians
1819 births
1874 deaths
Politicians from Philadelphia
19th-century American businesspeople
Burials in California
People of the California Gold Rush
American butchers